Bronisław Stanisław Rakowski (20 June 1895 in Szczucin – 28 December 1950 in Buenos Aires) was a Polish general. He fought in the Polish legions during World War I and was imprisoned by the Soviet NKVD during Soviet invasion of Poland. During World War II, he fought in the Anders Army and Polish Armed Forces in the West.

 1931–1936: Commanding Officer 12th Ulan Regiment
 1936–1939: Head of Army Historical Bureau
 1939–1941: Prisoner of War, Soviet Union
 1941–1942: General Officer Commanding 8th Division
 1942: General Officer Commanding 5th Division
 1942–1943: Chief of Staff Polish Forces in Soviet Union
 1943–1945: General Officer Commanding 2nd Armoured Brigade
 1945–1947: General Officer Commanding 2nd Armoured Division (2 Warszawska Dywizja Pancerna)

Honours and awards
 Gold Cross of the Order of Virtuti Militari (previously awarded the Silver Cross)
 Officer's Cross of the Order of Polonia Restituta
 Cross of Independence
 Cross of Valour - four times
 Gold Cross of Merit with Swords
 Officer's Cross of the Legion of Honour
 Distinguished Service Order (United Kingdom)
 Order of Saints Maurice and Lazarus (Italy)

References

1895 births
1950 deaths
People from Dąbrowa County
Polish generals
Polish legionnaires (World War I)
Polish military personnel of World War II
Officers of the Order of Polonia Restituta
Companions of the Distinguished Service Order
Recipients of the Gold Cross of the Virtuti Militari
Recipients of the Cross of Independence
Recipients of the Cross of Valour (Poland)
Recipients of the Cross of Merit with Swords (Poland)
Officiers of the Légion d'honneur
Recipients of the Order of Saints Maurice and Lazarus
Polish deportees to Soviet Union
Polish emigrants to Argentina
Polish people detained by the NKVD
Burials at La Recoleta Cemetery